Turn Ons is a covers album by The Hotrats. It was released in the UK on 25 January 2010. The album has received generally favorable reviews since its release. It entered the US Heatseekers at number 40.

Track listing

References 

2010 debut albums
Covers albums
The Hotrats albums
Fat Possum Records albums
Albums produced by Nigel Godrich